Linda Williams may refer to:
 Linda Williams, American folk singer in duo Robin and Linda Williams
 Linda Williams (singer) (born 1955), Dutch singer
 Linda Williams (film scholar) (born 1946), American professor of film studies
 Linda M. Williams (born c. 1949), American sociologist and criminologist
 Linda Ruth Williams (born 1961), British film studies academic
 Linda Hunt Williams (born 1948), American politician in the North Carolina House of Representatives